The 1944 Michigan gubernatorial election was held on November 7, 1944. Incumbent Republican Harry Kelly had defeated Democratic nominee Edward J. Fry with 54.69% of the vote.

General election

Candidates
Major party candidates
Harry Kelly, Republican
Edward J. Fry, Democratic
Other candidates
Seth A. Davey, Prohibition
Forest Odell, Socialist
Leland Marion, America First
Theos A. Grove, Socialist Labor

Results

Primaries
The primary elections occurred on July 11, 1944.

Republican primary

Democratic primary

References

1944
Michigan
Gubernatorial
November 1944 events